The Communauté de communes du Pays Créçois is a former federation of municipalities (communauté de communes) in the Seine-et-Marne département and in the Île-de-France région of France. It was created in February 1992. It was disbanded in January 2020, when 12 of its communes joined the Communauté d'agglomération Coulommiers Pays de Brie.

Composition
The communauté de communes consisted of the following 19 communes:

Bouleurs
Boutigny
Condé-Sainte-Libiaire
Couilly-Pont-aux-Dames
Coulommes
Coutevroult
Crécy-la-Chapelle
Esbly
La Haute-Maison
Montry
Quincy-Voisins
Saint-Fiacre
Saint-Germain-sur-Morin
Sancy
Tigeaux
Vaucourtois
Villemareuil
Villiers-sur-Morin
Voulangis

See also
Communes of the Seine-et-Marne department

References

Crecy